The Book of Jacob: The Brother of Nephi, usually referred to as the Book of Jacob, is the third of fifteen books in the Book of Mormon. According to the text, it was written by the ancient prophet Jacob.  The purpose of the book, in his own words, is to persuade all men to "come unto Christ" (Jacob 1:7).  While this book contains some history of the Nephites, including the death of Nephi, it is mainly a record of Jacob's preachings to his people. Chapter 5 contains the Parable of the Olive Tree, which is the longest chapter in the Book of Mormon, and which is a lengthy allegory of the scattering and gathering of Israel, comparing the Israelites and gentiles to tame and wild olive trees, respectively. Jacob is seven chapters long.

Narrative 
According to the Book of Mormon, in 545 BCE the prophet Nephi grew old and transferred record keeping responsibility to Jacob. Jacob writes that all the Jacobites, Josephites, and Zoramites were called Nephites together with the actual Nephites, and opposed to them were all the Lemuelites and Ishmaelites who were called Lamanites together with the actual Lamanites.

Despite being blessed by God, the Nephites became wicked. The book of Jacob contains numerous sermons by Jacob, calling the people of Nephi to repentance. Topics of the sermon included imparting of substance to the poor, admonitions against polygamy and concubines, and a lengthy allegory describing the Gathering of Israel in the last days.

The final section in the book tells the story of an antichrist named Sherem, who God smites at the request of Jacob. Sherem confesses that he was lying about Christ, and then dies.

When Jacob finished writing on the plates he bequeaths them to his son Enos.

Further reading

References

External links

 The Book of Jacob from the official website of The Church of Jesus Christ of Latter-Day Saints

Jacob